Ormetica taeniata is a moth of the family Erebidae. It was described by Félix Édouard Guérin-Méneville in 1844. It is found in Mexico, Costa Rica and Guatemala.

References

Ormetica
Moths described in 1844
Arctiinae of South America